Tazeh Kand-e Sheykh ol Eslam (also Romanized as Tāzeh Kand-e Sheykh ol Eslām; also known as Shīrīnābād) is a village in Gavdul-e Markazi Rural District, in the Central District of Malekan County, East Azerbaijan Province, Iran. At the 2006 census, its population was 149, in 38 families.

References 

Populated places in Malekan County